Club Deportivo Universitario (formerly Chorrillo F.C.) is a Panamanian football team playing in the Liga Panameña de Fútbol, the highest level of football in Panama.

It is based in Penonomé, Coclé Province, and is the first panamanian team to play on a privately owned stadium facility.

History
Chorrillo FC was founded in 1974 to prevent youngsters from becoming involved in criminal activities. They won promotion to the top fight for the first time in 2001 by beating Pan de Azúcar 2–1 in a promotion playoff. This was their second serious attempt at promotion, the first ending in a loss on penalties to Municipal de Colón.

The club won its first title in Apertura 2011, beating Plaza Amador 4–1. In May 2014 they won the 2014 Clausura title. They won another title in Clausura 2014, and later in Apertura 2017, as well as twice finishing runners-up.

In 2018, financial problems forced Chorillo FC to merge with CD Centenario and Panama City's Universidad Latina, the new name agreed is Club Deportivo Universitario. Parts of the agreement included that the team will be relocated to Penonomé on the Province of Coclé from Panama City´s El Chorrillo neighborhood, a construction of the new stadium that would be completed on late March 2019 and relocate/lease CD Centenario team from Penonomé to Colón Province as New York FC/Centenario.

Crest
The El Chorrillo district was heavily bombard by the United States Army during Operation Just Cause.  The club adopted the phoenix emblem to symbolize the district's recovery.

Honours
Liga Panameña de Fútbol: 3
2011 (A), 2014 (C), 2017 (A)
Runners-up (2): 2011 (C), 2009 (A)

Primera A: 1
2000–01
Runners-up (1): 1998

Players

Current squad
 As of September 2021

Notable players

Historical list of coaches

 Carlos García Cantarero (2005–2007)
 Carlos Flores (2008)
 José Alfredo Poyatos (Jan 2009–Dec 09)
 Félix Quiñones (Dec 2009–June 10)
 Miguel Mansilla (June 2010–June 11)
 Luis Maughn (June 2011–Aug 13)
 José Alfredo Poyatos (Aug 2013–Dec 13)
 César "Chino" Morales (Dec 2013–Feb 14)
 Julio Medina III (Feb 2014–May 15)
 Mike Stump (May 2015–)

 Óscar Upegui (June 2018 - September 2018)
 Julio Medina III (September 2018 - December 2018)
 Gustavo Onaindia (December 2018 - March 2019)
 Donaldo González (March 2019 - June 2019)
 Leonardo Pipino (June 2019 - October 2019)
 Richard Parra (October 2019 - December 2019)
 Gary Stempel  (January 2020 - February 2022)

References

External links
 Official website

Football clubs in Panama
Association football clubs established in 1974
1974 establishments in Panama